Giovanni Morandi may refer to:

 Giovanni Maria Morandi (1622–1717), Italian painter
 Giovanni Morandi (composer) (1777–1856), Romantic Italian organist and composer